A service release premium (SRP) is the payment received by a lending institution, such as a bank or retail mortgage lender, on the sale of a closed mortgage loan to the secondary mortgage market.  The secondary mortgage market purchaser is typically a Wall Street investment bank, Fannie Mae, Freddie Mac, or Ginnie Mae, as the first step in the creation of a mortgage-backed security (MBS).  Today, virtually all mortgages closed are purchased by the US government through the GSE Mortgage Backed Securities Purchase Program

The amount of SRP paid is based on the market value of the mortgage note, influenced by several key variables, such as interest rate, loan type, margin (for ARM loans), and the inclusion or exclusion of other items such as prepayment penalties.  Also considered are the loan's LTV (loan to value), the borrower's credit score, the presence of private mortgage insurance (PMI), pre-payment risk of the borrower and other factors beyond the scope of this article.

Since servicing was brought on balance sheet by all lenders there has been consolidation in the servicing market because many servicers believed that they could cross sell their products through servicing portfolios. While this strategy hasn't been as profitable as many would have thought it has worked well for some. These servicers therefore paid a premium for servicing compared to its present value.

Banking